Vijay Singh  is an Indian politician and a member of the 16th Legislative Assembly of Uttar Pradesh of India, 15th Legislative Assembly of Uttar Pradesh of India, 14th Legislative Assembly of Uttar Pradesh of India. He represents the Farrukhabad constituency of  Uttar Pradesh and is a member of the Samajwadi Party political party.

Early life and education
Vijay Singh was born in  district Farrukhabad of Uttar Pradesh. He is educated till tenth grade degree. Vijay Singh belongs to other backward class (obc) community.

Political career
Vijay Singh has been a MLA (from 2002-2017) for three terms. In 2002 Vijay Singh won the election as an independent candidate and again in 2012 also achieved  victory contesting election as independent candidate from Sadar seat of Farrukhabad. Vijay Singh's wife Damyanti Singh was also two times chairman (from 1997-2007) of Farrukhabad nagar palika. He represents the Farrukhabad constituency and is a member of the Samajwadi Party political party.

Vijay Singh was involved in murder of BJP MLA Brahm Dutt Dwivedi. The assassination case was investigated by the CBI. On July 17, 2003, the CBI court in Lucknow had sentenced gangster Sanjeev Maheshwari and former Samajwadi Party MLA Vijay Singh to life imprisonment in the case. Both convicts had challenged the judgment and filed an appeal in the high court. In 2017, the Lucknow bench of Allahabad High Court upheld the trial court judgment of life imprisonment.

Posts held

See also
Farrukhabad
Sixteenth Legislative Assembly of Uttar Pradesh
Uttar Pradesh Legislative Assembly

References 

Samajwadi Party politicians
Uttar Pradesh MLAs 2012–2017
People from Pratapgarh district, Uttar Pradesh
1970 births
Living people